Moroke Mokhotho (born 12 November 1990) is a Mosotho boxer. He competed in the men's flyweight event at the 2016 Summer Olympics where he lost in his first Olympic bout to Achraf Kharroubi in the first round. In March 2022, Mokhotho opened his own sports academy in Ha-Thetsane, Maseru.

References

External links
 

1990 births
Living people
Lesotho male boxers
Olympic boxers of Lesotho
Boxers at the 2016 Summer Olympics
Commonwealth Games competitors for Lesotho
Boxers at the 2014 Commonwealth Games
Boxers at the 2018 Commonwealth Games
Place of birth missing (living people)
African Games bronze medalists for Lesotho
African Games medalists in boxing
Competitors at the 2011 All-Africa Games
Competitors at the 2019 African Games
Flyweight boxers
Boxers at the 2022 Commonwealth Games